South African cuisine reflects the diverse range of culinary traditions embodied by the various communities that inhabit the country. Among the indigenous peoples of South Africa, the Khoisan foraged over 300 species of edible food plants, such as the rooibos shrub legume, whose culinary value continues to exert a salient influence on South African cuisine. Subsequent encounters with Bantu pastoralists facilitated the emergence of cultivated crops and domestic cattle, which supplemented traditional Khoisan techniques of meat preservation. In addition, Bantu-speaking communities forged an extensive repertoire of culinary ingredients and dishes, many of which are still consumed today in traditional settlements and urban entrepôts alike.

History
The San peoples were hunter-gatherers, who mostly depended on foods like tortoises, crayfish, coconuts and squash. Agriculture was introduced to South Africa by the Bantu peoples, who were taught to grow vegetables such as maize, squash and sweet potatoes.

By the 17th century, Dutch and British foodways brought via European immigration resulted in further culinary diffusion. The Cape Malay community founded a distinctive diasporic cuisine, derived largely from South East Asian culinary traditions, while Afrikaner voortrekkers further inland adapted Dutch, Khoisan, Cape Malay and Bantu foodways to accommodate their peripatetic lifestyle. In addition, French Huguenot refugees, many of whom settled in Franschhoek, played an instrumental role in developing South Africa's viticultural industry.

During the period of British colonial rule, immigrants from Asia, many of whom arrived as indentured laborers in the 19th century, further enriched the culinary oeuvre of South Africa. In particular, Indian South Africans brought a wealth of spices, seasonings and dishes, historically associated with Kwa-Zulu Natal, although Indian cuisine is currently widely available across South Africa and consumed by all ethnic groups.

Disinvestments and sanctions imposed on South Africa during apartheid stifled the country's culinary output. At this time shebeens, situated in urban townships, became very popular and often served as non-formal community centers, especially for black South Africans who pursued their cultural and culinary traditions. Following the end of apartheid, South African cuisine witnessed a renaissance, with diverse culinary options available in most of the country's major cities catering to tourists, expatriates and local residents. In addition, South African ingredients and dishes have attained greater visibility worldwide, owing to the burgeoning South African diaspora.

Indigenous cookery
In the precolonial period, indigenous cuisine was characterised by the use of a very wide range of foods including fruits, nuts, bulbs, leaves and other products gathered from wild plants and by the hunting of wild game. The introduction of domestic cattle and grain crops by Bantu speakers who arrived in the southern regions from central Africa since 10,000 BC and the spread of cattle keeping to Khoisan groups enabled products and the availability of fresh meat on demand.

The pre-colonial diet consisted primarily of cooked grains, especially sorghum and millet, fermented milk (somewhat like yogurt) and roasted or stewed meat. At some point, maize replaced sorghum as the primary grain, and there is some dispute as to whether maize, a Central American crop, arrived with European settlers (notably the Portuguese) or spread through Africa before white settlements via Africans returning from the Americas during the era of the slave trade.

People also kept sheep and goats, and communities often organised vast hunts for the abundant game, but the beef was considered the absolutely most important and high-status meat. The ribs of any cattle that were slaughtered in many communities were so prized that they were offered to the chief of the village.

In many ways, the daily food of South African families can be traced to the indigenous foods that their ancestors ate. A typical meal in a Bantu-speaking, South African household is a stiff, fluffy porridge of maize meal (called pap, and very similar to American grits) with a flavorful stewed meat gravy. Traditional rural families (and many urban ones) often ferment their pap for a few days—especially if it is sorghum instead of maize—which gives it a tangy flavour. The Sotho-Tswana call this fermented pap, ting.

Vegetables used are often some sort of pumpkin, varieties of which are indigenous to South Africa, although now many people eat pumpkins that originated in other countries. Rice and beans are also very popular although they are not indigenous. Another common vegetable dish, which arrived in South Africa with its many Irish immigrants, but which has been adopted by South Africans, is shredded cabbage and white potatoes cooked with butter.

For many South Africans meat is the center of any meal. The Khoisan ate roasted meat, and they also dried meat for later use. The influence of their diet is reflected in the common Southern African love of barbecue (generally called in South Africa by its Afrikaans name, a braai) and biltong (dried preserved meat). As in the past, when men kept cattle as their prized possession in the rural areas, South Africans have a preference for beef.

Today, South Africans enjoy not only beef, but mutton, goat, chicken and other meats as a centerpiece of a meal. On weekends, many South African families have a braai, and the meal usually consists of pap en vleis, which is maize meal and grilled meat. Eating meat even has a ritual significance in both traditional and modern South African culture.

In Bantu culture, for weddings, initiations, the arrival of family members after a long trip and other special occasions, families will buy a live animal and slaughter it at home, and then prepare a large meal for the community or neighbourhood. Participants often say that spilling the blood of the animal on the ground pleases the ancestors who invisibly gather around the carcass. On holiday weekends, entrepreneurs will set up pens of live animals along the main roads of townships—mostly sheep and goats—for families to purchase, slaughter, cook and eat. Beef being the most prized meat for weddings, affluent families often purchase a live steer for slaughter at home.

Non-indigenous cookery

During the pioneering days of the 17th century, new foods such as biltong, droëwors and rusks evolved locally out of necessity.

Cape Dutch and Cape Malay cookery

A very distinctive regional style of South African cooking is often referred to as "Cape Dutch". This cuisine is characterised mainly by the usage of spices such as nutmeg, allspice and chili peppers. The Cape Dutch cookery style owes at least as much to the cookery of the slaves brought by the Dutch East India Company to the Cape from Bengal, Java and Malaysia as it does to the European styles of cookery imported by settlers from the Netherlands, and this is reflected in the use of eastern spices and the names given to many of these dishes.

The Cape Malay influence has brought spicy curries, sambals, pickled fish, and variety of fish stews.

Bobotie is a South African dish that has Cape Malay origins. It consists of spiced minced meat baked with an egg-based topping. Of the many dishes common to South Africa, bobotie is perhaps closest to being the national dish, because it isn't commonly found in any other country.  The recipe originates from the Dutch East India Company colonies in Batavia, with the name derived from the Indonesian bobotok. It is also made with curry powder leaving it with a slight "tang". It is often served with sambal, a hint of its origins from the Malay Archipelago.

South African yellow rice, a sweet dish made with turmeric, raisins, cinnamon and sugar, also has its origins in Cape Malay cookery, often being referred to as Cape Malay yellow rice.

French cookery

French Huguenot refugees brought wines as well as their traditional recipes from France.

Indian cookery

Curried dishes are popular in South Africa among people of all ethnic origins; many dishes came to the country with the thousands of Indian indentured labourers brought to South Africa in the nineteenth century. South African Indian cuisine has contributed to South African cooking with a wide variety of dishes and culinary practices, including a variety of curries, sweets, chutneys, fried snacks such as samosa, and other savoury foods.

Bunny chow, a dish from Durban ("the largest 'Indian' city outside of India"), consisting of a hollowed-out loaf of bread filled with curry, has been adapted into mainstream South African cuisine.

Beverages

Beer has been an important beverage in South Africa for hundreds of years among indigenous people long before colonisation and the arrival of Europeans with their own beer drinking traditions. Traditional beer was brewed from local grains, especially sorghum. Beer was so prized that it became central to many ceremonies, like betrothals and weddings, in which one family ceremoniously offered beer to the other family.

Unlike European beer, South African traditional beer was unfiltered and cloudy and had a low alcohol content. Around the turn of the 1900s, when white-owned industry began studying malnutrition among urban workers, it was discovered that traditional beer provided crucial vitamins sometimes not available in the grain-heavy traditional diet and even less available in urban industrial slums.

When South Africa's mines were developed and black South Africans began to urbanise, women moved to the city also, and began to brew beer for the predominantly male labour force—a labour force that was mostly either single or who had left their wives back in the rural areas under the migrant labour system. That tradition of urban women making beer for the labour force persists in South Africa to the extent that informal bars and taverns (shebeens) are typically owned by women (shebeen queens).

Today, most urban dwellers buy beer manufactured by industrial breweries that make beer that is like beer one would buy in Europe and America, but rural people and recent immigrants to the city still enjoy the cloudy, unfiltered traditional beer.

Comparable to an American or western European diet, milk and milk products are very prominent in the traditional Black South African diet.  As cows were considered extremely desirable domestic animals in precolonial times, milk was abundant. In the absence of refrigeration, various kinds of soured milk, somewhat like yogurt, were a dietary mainstay. A visitor to any African village in the 1800s would have been offered a large calabash of cool fermented milk as a greeting.

Because milk cows allowed women to wean their children early and become fertile more quickly, local cultures had a number of sayings connecting cattle, milk and population growth, such as the Sotho-Tswana saying, "cattle beget children."

Today, in the dairy section of South Africa's supermarkets, one will find a variety of kinds of milk, sour milk, sour cream, and other modern versions of traditional milk products.

Restaurants and outlets

South Africa can be said to have a significant "eating out" culture. While there are some restaurants that specialise in traditional South African dishes or modern interpretations thereof, restaurants featuring other cuisines such as Moroccan, Chinese, West African, Congolese, and Japanese can be found in all of the major cities and many of the larger towns. There are also many home-grown chain restaurants, such as Spur and Dulce Café.

There is also a proliferation of fast-food restaurants in South Africa. While some international players such as Kentucky Fried Chicken and McDonald's are active in the country, they face stiff competition from local chains such as Nando's, Galito's, Steers, Chicken Licken, Barcelos, Fat Cake City and King Pie. Many of the restaurant chains originating from South Africa have also expanded successfully outside the borders of the country. Also, Starbucks is present in the country.

Typical South African foods and dishes

Savoury

Game and meats
Afrikaans
 Biltong—dried meat (typically seasoned with coriander seeds and salt). Although the meat used is most commonly beef, different variants also exist using springbok, kudu, eland, chicken and ostrich.
 Boerewors—a sausage that is traditionally braaied (barbecued).
 Droëwors—translates to dried sausage and is made like boerewors, but park meat is left out. It is dried the same way as biltong is. 
 Frikkadels—usually baked, but sometimes deep-fried, meatballs.
 Bokkoms—whole, salted and dried mullet.
 Skilpadjies—lamb's liver wrapped in netvet and braaied over hot coals.
 Smoked or braaied snoek—a regional gamefish.
 Sosatie—kebab, grilled marinated meat on a skewer.

 Amanqina—chicken feet, cow feet, pig feet, lamb feet and sheep feet, usually consumed with pap or as a delicacy. When cooking, just add water and salt.
 Walkie Talkies—grilled or deep-fried chicken feet and beaks). Another dish is a cookee pigs head known as a "smiley", most popular in townships and sold by street vendors, sometimes in industrial areas with high concentrations of workers.
 Ostrich—an increasingly popular protein source, as it has low cholesterol content, used in a stew or filleted and grilled.

Meals
Tsonga and Venda
 Mashonja/Matamani—made from Mopani worms

Afrikaans

 Gesmoorde vis—salted cod or snoek with potatoes and tomato sauce, sometimes served with apricot, grapes or moskonfyt.
 Hoenderpastei—chicken pot pie, traditional Afrikaans fare.

 Kaiings—made from lamb tail or lamb flank cut into small cubes, and cooked in a cast-iron pot over a slow fire. Kaiings resemble cracklings, though the skin is not as puffy and crispy as a crackling, and a small piece of protein is usually left on the skin and fat. They are a chewy traditional Boer delicacy often served as a topping over pap or with honey.
 Mielie-meal—a staple food, often used in baking but predominantly cooked into pap or Ugali
 Oepsies—a starter made on a braai. Similar to the American devils on horseback but exclusively made with cherries wrapped in bacon and battered with barbeque sauce. 
 Paptert—a tart used as a side dish for a braai. Made from pap, cheese, canned tomatoes and bacon. Both modern and traditional.
 Potjiekos—a traditional Afrikaans stew, made with meat and vegetables and cooked over coals in cast-iron pots.
 Tomato bredie—a lamb and tomato stew.
 Waterblommetjiebredie (water flower stew)—meat stewed with the flower of the Cape pondweed.

Indian
 Biryani—a mixed rice dish originating among the Muslims of the Indian subcontinent.
 Bunny chow—curry stuffed into a hollowed-out loaf of bread, often called Kota by the locals (usually those of African descent) who sometimes, instead of curry, fill the bread with slap chips (French fries), a slice of polony (bologna), cheese, and atchar (South Asian pickle) and other fillings and spices.
 Durban curry—more spicy than the Cape Malay version. Usually mutton is used and the most common spices used are cayenne pepper, paprika, cinnamon, cumin and fennel. Potatoes and carrots are sometimes also used.

Malay
 Bobotie—a dish of Malay descent, is like meatloaf with raisins and with baked egg on top, and is often served with yellow rice, sambals, coconut, banana slices, and chutney.
 Cape Malay curry—a curry most often made with chicken and spiced with mild masala. Spices include cinnamon, ginger, cardamom, cayenne pepper, coriander, garlic, turmeric, bay leaves, and fenugreek.

Zulu, Xhosa and Sotho
 Dombolo—dumplings, usually steamed in a pot.
 Isidudu—soft porridge made from ground corn known as "mealie meal".
 Mala mogodu—a local dish similar to tripe, usually eaten with hot pap and spinach.
 Iinkobe—summer salad made with boiled corn.
 Sigwaqani—boiled beans mixed with mealie-meal.
 Mqhavunyeko—wet corn mixed with beans.
 Trotters and beans—from the Cape, made from boiled pig's or sheep's trotters and onions and beans.
 Ugali—maize porridge in South Africa, traditional porridge/polenta and a staple food of the African peoples  
 Umngqusho—a  dish made from white maize and sugar beans, a staple food for the Xhosa people.
 Umphokoqo—an African salad made of maize meal.
 Umvubo—sour milk mixed with dry pap, commonly eaten by the Xhosa.

Breads
Afrikaans

 Braaibroodjie—a  sandwich consisting of two slices of bread with a filling of sliced tomato, cheese, onion, South African peach chutney (traditional Mrs. H.S. Balls) seasoned with salt and pepper. The braaibroodjie is placed in a folding braai grid (Gridiron) and slowly grilled over medium-hot coals until the cheese melts and the bread is browned.
 Gatsby—a sandwich popular in Cape Town, a long roll with fillings of anything ranging from polony (bologna) to chicken or steak and hot chips.
 Potbrood (pot bread or boerbrood)—savoury bread baked over coals in cast-iron pots.
Indian
 Samosa, or samoosa—a savoury stuffed Indian pastry that is fried. Very popular in South Africa.
 Kota, Skhambane (aka Bunny Chow)—a sandwich, quarter-loaf of bread usually stuffed with polony (bologna), cheese, atchar (South Asian pickle) and chips (French fries).

Relishes
 Chakalaka—a spicy South African vegetable relish.
 blatjang, or Mrs Balls Chutney, a sweet sauce made from fruit that is usually poured on meat.
 Monkey gland sauce—made of chopped onion, garlic and ginger, with a combination of chutney, soy sauce, mustard, Worcestershire sauce, ketchup, and wine (there are no monkeys involved.)

Fruits and plants
 Makataan—a wild fruit that grows in the Kalahari desert. It is soaked in limewater overnight (to remove the bitter taste) before processing into a jam known as Makataan konfyt.
 Marula—the yellow fruit of a local tree. This fruit is eaten and beloved by both the people and animals. Amarula liqueur is made from this fruit. The ripe fruit lying on the ground is processed into jams, wine and beer. Many local communities depend on this fruit for extra income. The jam is enjoyed with roosterkoek and on version steaks, such as kudu.
 Morogo—spinach-like wild plant sometimes seen as a weed. Traditionally boiled and served with pap, or dried in small lumps for extended shelf life. The traditional Afrikaner/Boer preparation usually incorporates onion, potato, or both.

Sweet

 Hertzoggie—a tartlet with an apricot jam filling and dried coconut meringue topping.
 Koeksisters—come in two forms and are a sweet delicacy among all South Africans. Afrikaans koeksisters are twisted pastries, deep fried and strongly sweetened. Koeksisters found in the Cape Flats are sweet and spicy, shaped like large eggs, and deep fried.
 Malva pudding—a sweet spongy apricot pudding of Dutch origin.
 Melktert—a milk-based tart or dessert.
 Melkkos—a traditional South African dish. Served as a standalone dish for supper and for lunch in some instances. (Famous traditional cookbooks such as the "Kook en Geniet" don't refer to this a dessert though).
 Mealie-bread—a sweet bread baked with sweetcorn.
 Mosbolletjies—a sweet bun made with aniseed and a grape juice leavening agent from the wine-making region of South Africa. Baked twice to make mosbeskuit.
 Pampoenkoekies (pumpkin fritters)—flour has been supplemented with or replaced by pumpkin. Some variants are patatkoekie (sweet-potato fritter), aartappelkoekie (potato fritter), ryskoekie (rice fritter), where pumpkin is replaced with either sweet potato, potato or rice.
 Peppermint crisp tart—a traditional fridge tart made with peppermint crisp chocolate, caramel treat, Tennis biscuits and fresh cream. 
 Rusks—a rectangular, hard, dry biscuit eaten after being dunked in tea or coffee; they are either home-baked or shop-bought (with the most popular brand being Ouma Rusks).
 Vetkoek (fat cake, doughnut, Amagwinya《 in isiXhosa 》)—deep-fried dough balls, typically stuffed with meat or served with snoek fish or jam.

Drinks

 Amasi—fermented milk.
 Boeber—a traditional Cape Malay sweet milk drink, made with vermicelli, sago, sugar, and flavoured with cardamom, stick cinnamon and rose water.
 Mafi—fermented milk, often consumed with pap or by itself.
 Mageu—a drink made from fermented mealie pap.
 Rooibos—a herbal tea indigenous to South Africa.
 Umqombothi—a type of beer made from fermented maize and sorghum.

See also

 Amarula
 List of African cuisines
 Malay cuisine
 Indian cuisine
 Dutch cuisine
 List of restaurants in South Africa
 South African wine

Footnotes

References

Citations 

 Coetzee, Renata, 1977. The South African Culinary Tradition, C. Struik Publishers, Cape Town, South Africa.
 Leipoldt, C. Louis, 1976. Leipoldt's Cape Cookery, Fleesch and Partners, Cape Town, South Africa.
 Van Wyk, B. and Gericke, N., 2000. People's plants: A guide to useful plants of Southern Africa, Briza, Pretoria, South Africa.
 Wylie, D., 2001. Starving on a Full Stomach: Hunger and the Triumph of Cultural Racism in Modern South Africa, University of Virginia Press, Charlottesville, VA., United States of America.
 Routledge Encyclopaedia of Africa – Farming

Sources 
Basemzanzi, B., & Moroka, T. 2004. South African indigenous foods : a collection of recipes of indigenous foods . Pretoria, IndiZAFoods.

External links

 South African cuisine – International Marketing Council of South Africa web site
 Food tourism
 DBFOODS.ORG
 Johannesburg Restaurants

 
Southern African cuisine

pt:Cultura da África do Sul#Culinária